The Hubei University of Medicine (HUM, Chinese: 湖北医药学院) is a public university in Shiyan City, Hubei Province, China. Founded in 1965, it was originally known as Wuhan Medical College Yunyang School (Chinese: 武汉医学院郧阳分院). The school was established in a remote mountain area in the northwest of Hubei Province, and has developed into the premier medical university in the adjacent areas of Hubei, Chongqing, Shaanxi and Henan provinces.

History

Wuhan Medical College Yunyang School (1965–1986) 
The school was founded in 1965 as Wuhan Medical College Yunyang School (武汉医学院郧阳分院), and its first vice president was Dr. Shixiao Xiang (项士孝). 

In order to establish the medical school in a remote mountain area in the northwest of Hubei Province, a team of 54 staff members composed of professionals and managers were selected from Wuhan Medical College (武汉医学院). Led by associate professor Shixiao Xiang, the school was first set up in Yun County(郧县), Yunyang, Hubei Province.  Classes began in January 1966 with 130 first-year students.

In the spring of 1967, with the construction of the Second Automobile Works and the establishment of the Shiyan City, the school moved to its current location in Shiyan.

Tongji Medical University Yunyang College (1986–1994) 
In 1986, as Wuhan Medical College changed its name to Tongji Medical University, the school was renamed Tongji Medical University Yunyang College (同济医科大学郧阳医学院).

Yunyang Medical College (1994–2010) 
In 1994, the college was renamed to Yunyang Medical College (郧阳医学院), independent from the Tongji Medical University. 

In 1998, the college incorporated with Shiyan Health/Medical School and Shiyan Nursing School.

Hubei University of Medicine (2010–now) 
In May 2010, the college was renamed the Hubei University of Medicine.

Presidents 
 1965~1978 Shixiao Xiang (former name: Schi-Hjau Hjiang) 项士孝 (vice-president)
 1978~1980 Yiting Yang 杨毅亭
 1981~1984 Yochun Shen 沈有春
 1984~2000 Guiyuan Yang 杨桂元
 2000~2007 Tiezhu Huang 黄铁柱
 2007~2017 Hanjun Tu 涂汉军
 2017~now  He Li 李和

Schools 
The university is now composed of 18 schools including Basic Medical Sciences, Clinical, Pharmacy, Nursing etc. HUM emphasizes undergraduate education and is developing graduate, continuing education and collaboration with other universities worldwide.

As of 2021, more than 15,000 students enrolled in the undergraduate programs, including full-time, part-time undergraduate students and continuing education students. The graduate student population is 503.

More than 200 foreign postgraduate and undergraduate students from Nepal, India, Pakistan, Bangladesh, and Tanzania are enrolled in the university.

 School of Basic Medical Sciences
 First Clinical School
 Second Clinical School
 Third Clinical School
 Fourth Clinical School
 Fifth Clinical School
 Sixth Clinical School
 School of Dentistry
 School of Pharmacy
 School of Nursing
 School of Public Administration
 School of Biomedical Engineering
 School of Continuing Education
 Institute of Medicine and Nursing (Independent College)

Master degree program 
 Clinical Medicine
 General Surgery
 Orthopaedics Surgery
 Paediatrics
 Dermatology
 Radiology
 ENT

Affiliated Hospitals 
As of 2021, the university has 6 affiliated hospitals. Three are located in Shiyan, and the rest are located in Xiangyang and Suizhou in Hubei province, and Ankang in Shaanxi province respectively.

 Taihe Hospital
 Dongfeng Hospital  
 Shiyan Renmin Hospital
 Xiang Yang No.1 People's Hospital
 Suizhou Central Hospital
 Ankang Central Hospital

Research laboratories and Institutes
 Hubei Key Laboratory of Embryonic Stem Cell Research
 Institute of Basic Medical Science
 Hubei Key Laboratory of Wudang Local Chinese Medicine Research
 Life Sciences Institute
 Clinical Medicine Institute
 Liver Surgery Institute
 Chinese Medicine Herb Pharmacology Laboratory3

References

Further reading 
郧阳医学院志: http://f.wanfangdata.com.cn/Book/default.aspx?id=Book_FZ004423

External links 
Official website (Chinese): http://www.hbmu.edu.cn/index.htm

Medical schools in China
Universities and colleges in Hubei
Shiyan
Educational institutions established in 1965
1965 establishments in China